is a former Japanese football player who last played for Blaublitz Akita.

Club statistics
Updated to 2 February 2018.

Honours
 FC Tokyo
 J2 League (1): 2011
 Emperor's Cup (1): 2011
 Blaublitz Akita
 J3 League (1): 2017

References

External links
Profile at Blaublitz Akita

1989 births
Living people
Association football people from Akita Prefecture
Japanese footballers
J1 League players
J2 League players
J3 League players
FC Tokyo players
Mito HollyHock players
FC Machida Zelvia players
V-Varen Nagasaki players
Blaublitz Akita players
Association football defenders
People from Akita (city)